Mike Berners-Lee is an English researcher and writer on carbon footprinting. He is a professor and fellow of the Institute for Social Futures at Lancaster University and director and principal consultant of Small World Consulting, based in the Lancaster Environment Centre at the university. His books include How Bad are Bananas?, The Burning Question and There Is No Planet B. He is considered an expert on carbon footprints. He is the son of Mary Lee Woods and Conway Berners-Lee; one of his brothers is computer scientist Sir Tim Berners-Lee.

He graduated in Physics from University of Oxford in 1986, gained a PGCE in Physics and Outdoor Education at Bangor University in 1988, and has a Masters in Organisation Development and Consulting from Sheffield Hallam University (2001).

Selected publications

 Second edition:  
 "Updated North American" edition:

References

External links
Burning Question website

Year of birth missing (living people)
Living people
Place of birth missing (living people)
People associated with Lancaster University
Alumni of the University of Oxford
Alumni of Bangor University
Alumni of Sheffield Hallam University
British climatologists
English science writers